The 2018–19 Eliteserien is the 52nd season of the Eliteserien, Norway's premier handball league.

Team information 
A total of 12 teams will be participating in the 2018/19 edition of Eliteserien. 9 teams were qualified directly from the 2017/18 season. The two top ranked teams from the First Division, Fana and Skrim Kongsberg, and third-place finisher Rælingen HK who defeated Sola HK in the relegation playoff were promoted to the Eliteserien.

Regular season

Standings

Results

In the table below the home teams are listed on the left and the away teams along the top.

Championship playoffs
Best of three format is applied in all playoff stages, with the higher seeded team playing the second and third game (if necessary) at home. If a game ended with a draw after the regular time, it will proceed to two 5-minutes periods of extra time. If there is still a draw, another 2 × 5-minutes extra time will be played. If the scores are still level after two extra times, the winners are decided by a 7-meter shootout.

Top ranked teams from the regular season choose their opponents in the quarterfinal and semifinal stages. The remaining two highest ranked teams after the quarterfinal stage can not meet in the semifinals.

Bracket

Quarterfinals

Vipers Kristiansand won series, 2–0.

Larvik HK won series, 2–1.

Tertnes Håndball Elite won series, 2–0.

Storhamar Håndball Elite won series, 2–0.

Semifinals

Vipers Kristiansand won series, 2–0.

Storhamar Håndball Elite won series, 2–1.

Finals

Vipers Kristiansand won the final series, 2–0.

Awards

All Star Team and other awards 
The All Star Team and other awards were announced on 14 June 2019.

Season statistics

Top goalscorers

Regular season

Playoffs

Overall

Attendances

 Teams that played last season in 1. divisjon.

Note: Attendance numbers without playoff matches.

Number of teams by regions

Relegation playoff

Gjerpen HK Skien won series, 2–0 and avoided from the relegation.

References

External links
 Norwegian Handball Federaration 

Eliteserien
Eliteserien
Eliteserien